The 1969 Ohio Bobcats football team was an American football team that represented Ohio University in the Mid-American Conference (MAC) during the 1969 NCAA University Division football season. In their 12th season under head coach Bill Hess, the Bobcats compiled a 5–4–1 record (2–3 against MAC opponents), finished in a tie for third place, and outscored all opponents by a combined total of 256 to 222.  They played their home games in Peden Stadium in Athens, Ohio.

Schedule

References

Ohio
Ohio Bobcats football seasons
Ohio Bobcats football